Petimezas or Petmezas is the name of a notable family of Greek armatoloi from the region of Kalavryta who played a significant role in the Greek War of Independence.

Notable members include:
Anagnostis Petimezas (1765–1822), Greek revolutionary leader
Athanasios Petimezas (1767–1804), Greek armatolos
Konstantinos Petimezas (1764–1824), Greek revolutionary leader
Nikolaos Petimezas (1790–1865), Greek revolutionary leader 
Vasileios Petimezas (1785–1872), Greek revolutionary leader and politician

Sources
 

Greek-language surnames